John Alexander Brewster (1826–1889) was the fourth California Surveyor General, serving from 1856 to 1858.

He first traveled to California with explorer John C. Frémont. Although the exact date of his arrival in California is not known, it probably predated the arrival of any other Surveyor General; he was most likely a resident of California prior to the Gold Rush. Brewster was elected Surveyor of Sonoma County, and his 1854 map of Santa Rosa was the first map recorded in that county.

Know-Nothings

In the early 1850s, the Whig party collapsed and a new political party emerged. This party called itself the American Party and its candidates were elected overwhelmingly in the 1855 California state election. General John A. Brewster was elected as a member of the American Party.

Although popular in its day, the American party's platform opposing the election of Roman Catholics and "foreigners" was controversial. The American Party came to be known as the "Know Nothing Party", because when asked about its platform, the members said: "I know nothing".

Wagon roads

By the mid-1850s, the public cry for developed wagon roads became so insistent that two routes over the Sierra Nevada mountains were proposed. In August 1856, Brewster led a reconnaissance party to Downieville, Sierra County, in order to examine one of these alternative routes over the Sierras. On the eastern side of Sierra County, they

In October 1856, he led a second expedition through Calaveras County. In his Annual Report of 1856, Brewster recommended funding the survey and construction of 6 major routes into California, as well as the building of other roads, and a railroad for commerce and transportation.

Official problems

General Brewster inherited a legacy of problems with his office.

General Brewster discovered that surveys of Swamp and Overflowed lands by the United States Deputy Surveyors differed, in some cases by several million acres, from the amounts recommended by the California Surveyor General to be donated to the State.

Like General Marlette before him, Brewster noted significant errors in surveys of county boundaries, calling for alterations in the boundaries of several counties to avoid ambiguity, since, "in some instances it is impossible to determine the lines at all."

"The existing official map of the State is a broad burlesque upon the topography of California ... and (it) should be replaced at once by a map conforming to the true character of the country." It is not known if Brewster ever completed a new, official map.

Family life 
After his term as Surveyor General, Brewster traveled east to marry Julia E. Kaene, a native of Canada, on November 1, 1858, in Buffalo, New York. The General and his wife returned to California and made their home in Sonoma.

General Brewster mustered into the 63rd Indiana Volunteers, US (Union) Army during the American Civil War. He penned the following to his infant daughter during his service:

Brewster survived the Civil War, and died in California at the age of 62. He is interred in Cypress Lawn Memorial Park, Colma, California.

References

California Know Nothings
19th-century American politicians
1826 births
1889 deaths
American surveyors